Domingo Barrera (born 9 March 1943) is a Spanish boxer. He competed in the men's lightweight event at the 1964 Summer Olympics.

References

1943 births
Living people
Spanish male boxers
Olympic boxers of Spain
Boxers at the 1964 Summer Olympics
Place of birth missing (living people)
Lightweight boxers